String Quartet No. 3 in G major, Op. 94, by English composer Benjamin Britten was his last completed major work, and his last completed instrumental work. It was written in OctoberNovember 1975 during his final illness: the first four movements at his home, The Red House, Aldeburgh, and the fifth during his last visit to Venice, at Hotel Danieli. It was dedicated to the musicologist Hans Keller. In December 1975, brothers Colin and David Matthews performed it privately for the composer in a piano duet arrangement. During September 1976, Britten worked on it with the Amadeus Quartet; who premiered it on 19 December 1976 at The Maltings, Snape, two weeks after the composer's death.

Musical structure 
The quartet is in five movements:

All five movements are in ternary (A-B-A) form. The quartet is in arch form, with a slow lyrical central movement enclosed by two scherzos themselves enclosed by two slow outer movements. English musicologist Peter Evans has remarked that that structure invites comparison with Bartók's fourth and fifth string quartets; only to dismiss that comparison almost as soon as made.

In "Duets", Britten explores all six possible relationships between the four instruments in a quartet.

The "Recitative" which begins the last movement includes five musical quotations from Britten's 1973 opera Death in Venice (his last). The concluding "Passacaglia" (one of Britten's favorite musical forms) is based on a musical motif from that opera. Its title, La Serenissima (English: the most serene), derives from the historic status of the former Republic of Venice as a sovereign republic, and is sometimes still applied to the modern city of Venice.

A typical performance takes about 25 minutesalthough according to musicologist Roger Parker, Britten's markings are so precise that the timing of each movement is specified almost to the second.

Critical reception 
Musicologist Peter Evans:

Teacher and composer Robert Saxton:

Composer David Matthews:

Musicologist Roger Parker:

Musicologist Ben Hogwood:

Recordings 

 1978Amadeus Quartet, Decca LP SXL 6893; remastered 1990 London Records CD 425 715-2 
 1981Alberni Quartet, CRD Records LP CRD 1095; rereleased 1989, CRD Records CD CRD 3395 
 1986Endellion Quartet
 1990Britten Quartet
 1996The Lindsays, ASV Digital CD DCA 608 
 2002Brodsky Quartet, Challenge CD CC 72099 
 2002 - Verdi Quartett, Haenssler Classic CD 98.394
 2005Belcea Quartet, EMI Classics CD 7243 5 57968 2 0 
 2013Takács Quartet, Hyperion CD CDA68004  
 2017Emerson String Quartet, Decca CD B0026509-02

References

External links 
 . A musicological lecture by Roger Parker followed by a performance by the Badke Quartet, at Gresham College, London in 2013

1975 compositions
1975
String quartet Britten 3